Charles Franklin Mitchell (February 18, 1806 – September 27, 1865) was a U.S. Representative from New York in the Twenty-fifth and Twenty-sixth Congresses.

Biography
Charles F. Mitchell was born in Middletown Township, Bucks County, Pennsylvania on February 18, 1806.  A Quaker, he attended the public schools in Pennsylvania and became a journeyman miller.  He settled in Lockport, New York in 1828 or 1829, operated a successful grain milling business, and was appointed to the volunteer fire department in 1829.  He was also active in other business ventures, including the Batavia and Lockport Railroad and the Niagara Suspension Bridge Bank.

On December 2, 1829 he married Elizabeth F. Ellis in Henrietta, New York.  She was born in Princeton, New Jersey on October 23, 1809 and died in Cincinnati, Ohio on February 24, 1898.

Active as a Whig, he was an early protege and business partner of Thurlow Weed.  In 1836 he was elected to the U.S. House as the Representative of New York's 33rd District.  He was reelected in 1838 and served from March 4, 1837 to March 3, 1841.

During his second term he was accused of not devoting his full attention to the business of Congress, and of not spending time in his district.  He was convicted of forgery later in 1841, and sentenced to one year in prison and a fine, but paroled for ill health, and later pardoned.

He later lived in Cincinnati and northern Kentucky.  By the time of the American Civil War, Mitchell had established himself in Flemingsburg, Kentucky.  By now a Republican, in 1860 and 1861 he sent letters to Abraham Lincoln and others in Lincoln's administration, in which he described the Kentucky political situation and the prospects for success at keeping the state in the Union.

Later in the war Mitchell was part of a delegation that lobbied Secretary of State William H. Seward for the release of individuals from the Flemingsburg area who were being held prisoner for suspected Confederate sympathies, with Mitchell taking part because he was personally acquainted with Seward from their time as Whig politicians in New York.

He died in Cincinnati, Ohio on September 27, 1865 and was buried at Spring Grove Cemetery in Cincinnati.

References

External links
The Political Graveyard

1806 births
1865 deaths
19th-century American politicians
Burials at Spring Grove Cemetery
Forgers
People from Bucks County, Pennsylvania
People from Flemingsburg, Kentucky
Politicians from Cincinnati
Politicians from Lockport, New York
Whig Party members of the United States House of Representatives from New York (state)